Events in the year 1953 in Bulgaria.

Incumbents 

 General Secretaries of the Bulgarian Communist Party: Valko Chervenkov
 Chairmen of the Council of Ministers: Valko Chervenkov

Events 

 20 December – Parliamentary elections were held in Bulgaria.

Sports 

 Vasil Levski National Stadium, Bulgaria's second largest stadium, was officially opened.

References 

 
1950s in Bulgaria
Years of the 20th century in Bulgaria
Bulgaria
Bulgaria